Širvėna Lake is a lake located in Biržai municipality, northern Lithuania. It is the oldest artificial lake in Lithuania. It was created in 1575 when the dam was built on rivers Agluona and Apaščia. The lake was built to protect the Radvila castle in Biržai. Now the city of Biržai, which was built around the castle, is located on the southern shore of Širvėna lake. The suburb of Astravas is built on the northern and the suburb of Rinkuškiai on the western shore.

Other names 
 Biržų ežeras (The Lake of Biržai);
 Rališkių ežeras (Lake Rališkiai, before World War II);
 Prūdas (from Slavic word pond)

Gallery 

Sirvena